Manas Bakyt Uulu Zhutanov (born 22 August 1991) is a Russian former football defender of Kyrgyzstani descent.

Club career
He made his professional debut for FC KAMAZ Naberezhnye Chelny on 17 October 2011 in a Russian Football National League game against FC Khimki.

References

External links
 

1991 births
Russian people of Kyrgyzstani descent
Kyrgyzstani emigrants to Russia
People from Osh Region
Living people
Russian footballers
Association football defenders
FC KAMAZ Naberezhnye Chelny players
FC Abdysh-Ata Kant players